The SNCF Class Z 6400 electric multiple unit trains were built by Alsthom/Carel et Fouché from 1976 to 1979. They are chiefly used in commuter service to the Gare Saint-Lazare in Paris, serving the northwest Paris suburbs.

Seventy-five of these 4-car units built for use on suburban service in the west of Paris, operating mainly on the Transilien Line L. The 4-car units are most often used in double-formation as 8-car sets. 43 sets have doors arranged for high platforms, while the remainder are for low platforms.

They are being replaced by the Class Z 50000 units with complete withdrawal expected by 2021.

See also
 CPTM (São Paulo commuter rail) operates a partially-forked version of the Z 6400 called CPTM 5000/5400 series (pt), manufactured by the Cobrasma–Francorail consortium in the late-1970s for the then-FEPASA – Ferrovia Paulista S/A on what is now CPTM Line 8

References

Z 06400
Alstom multiple units
Electric multiple units of France

25 kV AC multiple units